Corpse paint is a style of black and white makeup used mainly by black metal bands for concerts and band photos. The makeup is used to make the musicians appear inhuman, corpse-like, or demonic, and is perhaps "the most identifiable aspect of the black metal aesthetic."

Corpse paint typically involves making the face and neck white and making the area around the eyes and lips black. Musicians will often have a trademark style. Other colors are seldom used, yet there are notable exceptions, such as Attila Csihar's use of neon colors and the bands Satyricon and Dødheimsgard experimenting with color as well.

Outside of black metal, face-painting and black and white makeup has been used by a variety of other public figures such as shock rock artists (notably Arthur Brown, Alice Cooper, members of Kiss, and members of the Misfits) and professional wrestlers (e.g. Sting and Vampiro).

History and usage
The earliest rock groups to wear makeup similar to corpse paint included Screamin' Jay Hawkins and Arthur Brown in the 1960s; Secos & Molhados, Alice Cooper, Kiss and guitarist Zal Cleminson of the Sensational Alex Harvey Band in the 1970s whose makeup, colorful clothes and menacing demeanor evoked the evil clown trope. Later that decade, shock rock and heavy metal influenced punk rock bands like the Misfits and singer David Vanian of The Damned. On seeing shock rock pioneer Arthur Brown performing his US number two hit "Fire" in 1968, Alice Cooper states, "Can you imagine the young Alice Cooper watching that with all his make-up and hellish performance? It was like all my Halloweens came at once!."

In the 1980s, Hellhammer and King Diamond of Mercyful Fate (who used face paint similar to corpse paint as early as 1978 in his band Black Rose) were among the early metal groups to use corpse paint. Per "Dead" Ohlin was the first to explicitly associate stylized face paint with an attempt to look like a corpse according to Mayhem drummer Jan Axel "Hellhammer" Blomberg. Other groups soon followed suit, including Hellhammer's later incarnation Celtic Frost. Brazilian band Sarcófago also pioneered the look, being dubbed by Metal Storm magazine as the first band with "true" corpse paint. However, Necrobutcher insists that his band Mayhem was the first to use corpse paint and credits the band's singer Per "Dead" Ohlin with coining the term. Early corpse paint was meant simply to highlight an individual's features and make them look "dead."

Bands of the early Norwegian black metal scene used corpse paint extensively. Early vocalist of Mayhem Per "Dead" Ohlin started wearing it in the late 1980s. According to Necrobutcher, Mayhem's bass player: "It wasn't anything to do with the way Kiss and Alice Cooper used makeup. Dead actually wanted to look like a corpse. He didn't do it to look cool." In the early 1990s, other Norwegian black metal bands followed suit and their style and sound was adopted by bands around the world. Eventually, some Norwegian bands—such as Emperor and Satyricon—stopped wearing corpse paint, often citing its loss of meaning or trendiness due to use by so many bands.

Examples

See also
Heavy metal fashion

References

External links
 How To Apply Corpse Paint
 Dravenstales.ch Brief history of corpse paint

Black metal
Cosmetics
Heavy metal fashion